Pandit Kartick Kumar is an Indian musician and Sitarist, He was also a disciple of pandit Ravi Shankar and father of Niladri Kumar.
In 1958, Kumar was awarded the President's Gold Medal All India Award for sitar at a music competition held by All India Radio. He moved to Mumbai in 1960.

References

Indian musicians
Deutsche Grammophon artists
Recipients of the Sangeet Natak Akademi Award